A test market, in the field of business and marketing, is a geographic region or demographic group used to gauge the viability of a product or service in the mass market prior to a wide scale roll-out.  The criteria used to judge the acceptability of a test market region or group include:
a population that is demographically similar to the proposed target market; and
relative isolation from densely populated media markets so that advertising to the test audience can be efficient and economical.

Practical use 
The test market ideally aims to duplicate "everything" - promotion and distribution as well as "product" - on a smaller scale. The technique replicates, typically in one area, what is planned to occur in a national launch; and the results are very carefully monitored, so that they can be extrapolated to projected national results. The area may be any one of the following:
Television area
Internet online test
Test town
Residential neighborhood
Test site
 
A number of decisions have to be taken about any test market:
Which test market? 
What is to be tested? 
How long a test? 
What are the success criteria?
 
The simple go or no-go decision, together with the related reduction of risk, is normally the main justification for the expense of test markets. At the same time, however, such test markets can be used to test specific elements of a new product's marketing mix; possibly the version of the product itself, the promotional message and media spend, the distribution channels and the price. In this case, several `matched' test markets (usually small ones) may be used, each testing different marketing mixes.
  
Clearly, all test markets provide additional information in advance of a launch and may ensure that launch is successful: it is reported that, even at such a late stage, half the products entering test markets do not justify a subsequent national launch. However, all test markets do suffer from a number of disadvantages:
Replicability - Even the largest test market is not totally representative of the national market, and the smaller ones may introduce gross distortions. Test market results therefore have to be treated with reservations, in exactly the same way as other market research. 
Effectiveness - In many cases the major part of the investment has already been made (in development and in plant, for example) before the `product' is ready to be test marketed. Therefore, the reduction in risk may be minimal; and not worth the delays involved. 
Competitor warning - Test markets can give competitors advance warning of a company's intentions and time to react. They may even be able to go national with their own product before the test is complete. They may also interfere with a test, by changing their promotional activities (usually by massively increasing them) to the extent that results are meaningless. 
Cost - Although the main objective of test markets is to reduce the amount of investment put at risk, they may still involve significant costs.

It has to be recognized that the development and launch of almost any new product or service carry a considerable element of risk. Indeed, in view of the ongoing dominance of the existing brands, it has to be questioned whether the risk involved in most major launches is justifiable. In a survey of 
700 consumer and industrial companies, Booz Allen Hamilton reported an average new product success rate (after launch) of 65 percent; although it had to be noted that only 10 percent of these were totally new products and only 20 per cent new product lines - but these two, highest risk, categories also dominated the `most successful' new product list (accounting for 60 percent).
  
New product development has therefore to be something of a numbers game. A large number of ideas have to be created and developed for even one to emerge. There is safety in numbers; which once more confers an advantage to the larger organizations.

Risk versus time
Most of the stages of testing, which are the key parts of the new "product" process, are designed to reduce risk; to ensure that the product or service will be a success. However, all of them take time.
  
In some markets, such as fashion businesses for example, time is a luxury which is not available. The greatest risk here is not having the "product" available at the right time, and ahead of the competitors. These markets consequently obtain less benefit from the more sophisticated new product processes, and typically do not make use of them at all.
  
When to enter a market with a new product should, in any case, be a conscious decision. In relation to competitors there are two main alternatives:
Pioneer
Being first into a market carries considerable risks. On the other hand, the first brand is likely to gain a major, leading and ongoing, share of that market in the long term. Pioneering is often the province of the smaller organizations, on a small scale, since their investment can be that much less than that of the majors.
Latecomer
This offers the reverse strategy. The risk is minimized since the pioneer has already demonstrated the viability of the market. On the other hand, the related reward, that of becoming the market leader, may also be missed. 

To a certain extent this discussion has now long since been overtaken by events. Japanese corporations 
led the way in reducing development time dramatically, and even to halving it in the very mature car industry. To quote George Stalk of the Boston Consulting Group:
The effects of this time-based advantage are devastating; quite simply, American companies are losing leadership of technology and innovation ... Unless U.S. companies reduce their product development and introduction cycles from 36-48 months to 12-18 months, Japanese manufacturers will easily out-innovate and outperform them.  
Accordingly, the choice to pioneer or to follow no longer exists in a number of industries. The only way for an organization even to survive may be to shorten development times below those of its competitors.

Product replacement
One form of new product launch, which is little discussed, but is probably the most prevalent - and hence most important - of all, is that of replacement of one product by a new one; usually an "improved" version. The risk levels may be much reduced, since there is an existing user base to underwrite sales (as long as the new product doesn't alienate them - as New Coca-Cola did in the US and New Persil did in the UK). Such an introduction will be complicated by the fact that, at least for some time, there will be two forms of the product in the pipeline. Some firms may opt for a straight cut-over; one day the old product will be coming off the production line, and the next day the new product. Most will favour parallel running for a period of time, even if only because this is forced upon them by their distribution chains. This ensures that the new really does, 
eventually, replace the old; and it may reveal that both can run together.

Virtual test markets
The considerable amounts of time and resources necessary to conduct test markets, restrict the amount of test markets which can be conducted by companies. The risk to reveal a new product design too early is another concern for companies in fast moving and highly competitive markets, which is independent from any cost & time considerations. To overcome these limitations a new type of test markets, so called Virtual Test Markets, was devised. Virtual Test Markets are computer simulations of consumers, companies and the market environment. The technological basis for this kind of test market is a multi-agent system as well as methods from artificial intelligence. In a virtual test market, new products or marketing and distribution strategies can be tested without the risk and time constraints discussed above. Another advantage is the ability to test many different products in one Virtual Test Market as the computer simulation can always be reset to the original situation before the introduction of a new product.

See also
 Albany, New York and Peoria, Illinois (traditional United States test markets)
 Haßloch (one of Germany's test markets)
 Swindon (used as a UK-based test market for the introduction of Mondex and other product innovations)

References
 Booz, Allen and Hamilton Inc., New Products Management for the 1980s (1982)
 Klan, Arhur; New trends of Global Marketing
 Stalk G. Jr; "Time --the next source of competitive advantage", Harvard Business Review (July-August 1988)

External links

 ACXIOM 150 USA test markets ranked best to worst as to how well they reflect the US market as a whole. (accessed September 13, 2005)
 Marketing by David Mercer, Chapter 6

Aptitude
Market research
Product management
Product testing